Rangali is an island in Alif Dhaal Atoll, Maldives. 

It is the location for the 151 room Conrad Maldives Rangali Island resort, which has twice been voted the best hotel in the world. 

It is known for its underwater restaurant Ithaa.

References

Islands of the Maldives
Resorts in the Maldives